Zalun Township is a township of Hinthada District in the Ayeyarwady Division of Myanmar. The township consists of Zalun town, which has five wards, and 462 villages.

Towns and villages

 Amyet
 Apyauk
 Chaunggyi
 Danube
 Daunggyi
 Gamonzu
 Gonnyindan
 Gwetkyi
 Hna-eindan
 Htonput
 Ingade
 Inswet
 Kanugale
 Kanugyi
 Kanyinkwin
 Kawt Kat
 Kawt Sein
 Kya-in
 Kyaungzu
 Kyongyaik
 Kyonsha
 Khin Pyae
 Kyon-Zayit
 Kywepaganchaung
 Leikkonzu
 Le-u
 Manyeinzu
 Mayokha
 Maung Htaung
 Mee Thway Gone
 Methaung
 Merry Land
 Myitwa
 Nandawgyun
 Nankala
 Nyaungbintha
 Nyaungbinze
 Nyein-e
 Nyein-e-thida
 Okshitkwin
 Padonpeik
 Pagwe
 Paingkyon
 Pai Saw Nan
 Paletko
 Phat Thaung
 Shwedaungzu
 Shwe Kyaung
 Songon
 Thadugyaung Taung
 Thayettaw
 Thegon
 Thetkekyun
 Tontabon
 Yebawthaung
 Yele
 Yone Daw
 Zalun
 Zawgyi
 Zinyawkyun

External links
 "Zalun Township" map, 2008, Myanmar Information Management Unit (MIMU)

Townships of Ayeyarwady Region